

Background
The 2014 Barking and Dagenham Council election took place on 23 May 2014 to elect members of Barking and Dagenham Council in England. This was on the same day as other United Kingdom local elections.

Labour won all 51 seats on the council in 2010, but by the time of this election had only 44 councillors due to defections with Robert Douglas, Dorothy Hunt, Graham Letchford and Tariq Saeed defecting to the UK Independence Party, and James McDermott, Barry Poulton and Gerald Vincent defecting to the Socialist Labour Party. All of these councillors stood for re-election in the borough representing their new parties (aside from Letchford, who stood in the Enfield Council election), but none retained their seats, with Labour candidates winning all 51 seats for the second consecutive election. The only ward where Labour faced any real challenge was Mayesbrook, where the borough's former Labour mayor Dorothy Hunt, now representing UKIP, failed to win a seat by 12 votes.

UKIP stood candidates in every ward for the first time, and finished as runners-up to Labour in every ward except Longbridge. The Conservatives and Liberal Democrats remained on the fringes in the borough. The British National Party, who won 12 seats on the council in 2006, all of which they lost in 2010, declined even further at this election, only standing candidates in three wards and picking up a total of 1,137 votes, placing them sixth overall. Other parties to field candidates in the borough were the Greens, Socialist Labour Party and TUSC. The Europeans Party, a pro-EU party who support the rights of EU citizens in the UK, also stood a candidate. There were also two independent candidates.

Election results

|}

Ward results

Abbey

Alibon

Becontree

Chadwell Heath

Eastbrook

Eastbury

Gascoigne

Goresbrook

Heath

Longbridge

Mayesbrook

Parsloes

River

Thames

Valence

Village

Whalebone

By-elections between 2014 and 2018
There were no by-elections.

References

2014
2014 London Borough council elections